is a Japanese footballer who plays as a defensive midfielder for Vissel Kobe in the J1 League.

Career
Ogihara debuted for Cerezo Osaka in the 2–1 loss to Kashima Antlers on 27 August 2011.

International career
Ogihara debuted for the Japan U-23s during the Qualification process for the 2012 London Olympics, with his first game in a 2–0 win over Malaysia.  He played for Japan at the 2012 Summer Olympics.

Club statistics
Updated to 19 December 2020.

National team statistics

Honours

Japan
EAFF East Asian Cup (1) : 2013

References

External links

 
 Japan National Football Team Database
 
Profile at Yokohama F. Marinos
 
 

1991 births
Living people
Association football people from Osaka Prefecture
People from Sakai, Osaka
Japanese footballers
Japan international footballers
J1 League players
J2 League players
Cerezo Osaka players
Nagoya Grampus players
Yokohama F. Marinos players
Vissel Kobe players
Olympic footballers of Japan
Footballers at the 2012 Summer Olympics
Association football midfielders